Sea of Worry is the third studio album by American band Have a Nice Life, released on November 8, 2019, on the Flenser. It is their first album to feature a full band.

Background and recording 
The album was announced by the band in August 2019. Shortly after the announcement, on the 27th, the band released the title track as a single. Three other singles were released in advance of the album: "Lords of Tresserhorn", on September 17th; "Science Beat", on October 15th; and "Dracula Bells", on November 7th.

Two of the tracks, "Trespassers W" and "Destinos", were re-recorded versions of songs that appeared on their 2009 compilation album Voids. Dan Barrett had been working on producing "Destinos" by 2006 at the latest, according to a blog post.

Musical style 
The album has been described as more straightforward and accessible than the band's previous two LPs. Similarly, it is significantly more polished and has higher production quality, a departure from the band's typical lo-fi sound.

The album takes influence from several genres, varying from track to track. Songs like "Sea of Worry", "Science Beat", and "Dracula Bells" have been compared to post-punk, new wave, and gothic rock. "Lords of Tresserhorn", according to Marika Zorzi of New Noise Magazine, "seamlessly blends their sweeping shoegaze/post-punk/experimental sound" in a way reminiscent of their earlier releases, while Bill Peel of Kill Your Stereo noted a post-rock influence. The album also features an instrumental track: "Everything We Forget".

Album themes 
Much like the band's previous releases, many songs feature lyrics about depression. Moreover, several songs discuss religion, particularly Christianity. "Dracula Bells" and "Trespassers W" both feature lyrics critical of the religion, while Destinos begins with a recording of a preacher lecturing about God sending sinners to hell.

The name of the track "Lords of Tresserhorn" is a reference to Magic: the Gathering.

Critical reception 

The album was praised by Aristocrazia Webzine, who wrote that "being sad has never been so beautiful." Other outlets that gave the album positive feedback include Pitchfork, Spectrum Culture, and Stereogum.

The release was panned by Sputnikmusic, calling it "predictable".

Track listing

References 

2019 albums
Experimental rock albums
The Flenser albums